Backbeat is a rhythmic accentuation on even beats.

Backbeat may also refer to:
 Backbeat (biography), a biography of drummer Earl Palmer
 Backbeat (film) (1994), chronicles the early days of The Beatles in Hamburg, Germany
 Backbeat (soundtrack), original soundtrack of the 1994 film Backbeat
 Back Beat Records, record label
 Backbeat Books, an imprint of American publisher Hal Leonard LLC
 The Backbeats, a vocal group on season 2 of The Sing Off

See also
 Beat (music)#Downbeat
 Off-beat (music)
 Syncopation